Barghat is a town and a Nagar Parishada in Seoni district in the a state of Madhya Pradesh, India. It has an average elevation of 537 metres (1,761 feet).

Demographics
As of the 2001 India census, Barghat had a population of 20,000, with males constituting 51% and females 49%. Barghat has an average literacy rate of 73%, higher than the national average of 59.5%; with 56% of the males and 44% of females literate. 13% of the population is under 6 years of age.

Education And Sports 
There are government and privately owned educational institutes. Some of them are:

-Government Degree College Barghat

-Govt ITI College Barghat.
- Shri Ram  ITI college

Now Barghat is setting to develop in a proper way as sports and sports  ground are there such as 
- Takkar singh stadium,  here state championship is being organised (don't confuse with Ranji). 
-indoor stadium

References

Cities and towns in Seoni district
Seoni, Madhya Pradesh